Xiphodon is an extinct  genus of artiodactyl mammals found in European Eocene formations. It had slender legs, didactylous feet, and small canine teeth. Xiphodon was closely related to camels.

References

Tylopoda
Eocene even-toed ungulates
Eocene mammals of Europe
Prehistoric even-toed ungulate genera